Munier is a French surname, most prevalent in France.

Notable people with this surname include:
 Carlo Munier (1859–1911), Italian mandolinist
 Émile Munier (1840–1895), French artist
 Ernest Munier-Chalmas (1843–1903), French geologist
 Henri Munier (1884–1945), French bibliographer
 Laurent Munier (born 1966), French handball player
 Mishuk Munier (1959–2011), Bangladeshi journalist
 Nick Munier (born 1968), English maitre d'hotel
 Roger Munier (1923–2010), French writer
 Vincent Munier (born 1976), French wildlife photographer

As given name
 Munier Choudhury (1925–1971), Bangladeshi educationist

See also
 Meunier
 Menier
 Mounier

References